Drew Paschal Saunders (born June 9, 1938) is a former Democratic member of the North Carolina General Assembly where he represented the state's ninety-ninth House district, including constituents in Mecklenburg county. Saunders was defeated in the 2008 Democratic primary by Nick Mackey with Mackey receiving 53% of the vote to 47% for Saunders. Saunders is a human resources manager from Huntersville, North Carolina and served six terms in the state House.

Stated during a discussion on North Carolina ethics laws "Even the baby Jesus accepted gifts, and I don't think it corrupted him.

Electoral history

2008

2006

2004

2002

2000

References

|-

Living people
1938 births
People from Anson County, North Carolina
People from Huntersville, North Carolina
University of North Carolina at Charlotte alumni
Wake Forest University alumni
21st-century American politicians
Democratic Party members of the North Carolina House of Representatives